Qaleh-ye Dizijan (also Romanized as Qal‘eh-ye Dīzījān and Qal‘eh Dīzī Jān; also known as Ghal‘eh Dizijan) is a village in Qarah Kahriz Rural District, Qarah Kahriz District, Shazand County, Markazi Province, Iran. At the 2006 census, its population was 309, in 78 families.

References 

Populated places in Shazand County